Ipsen International Holding GmbH  of Kleve, Germany develops, constructs and manufactures industrial furnaces. Its managing directors are Joshua Cell 
Houman Khorram.

The Ipsen Group has 1,000 employees worldwide and has manufacturing sites in Germany, United States, India, Malaysia, China und Japan. It has sales and representatives at these sites and in 34 other countries.

History 
Harold Ipsen (1915-1965) founded Ipsen Industries in Rockford, Illinois in 1948. The company moved to its German manufacturing site in Kleve in 1957.

Products 
Ipsen's industrial furnaces are used for hardening steel and other metals in different processes  to satisfy completely the high-quality requirements of engines, gears, generating plant manufacturing and other industrial parts and equipment.

Ipsen has customers in medical technology and engineering, wind power generation, aviation, food, automotive, aerospace, tool manufacturing, mechanical engineering and hardening shops.

Heat treatment is a crucial, very cost-effective process to considerably improve the structural conditions and consequently the resilience of metals, in particular to steel and titanium alloys. Ipsen's industrial furnaces - vacuum furnaces, atmosphere furnaces and  pusher-type furnaces - are used for the following heat treatment processes: hardening, quenching, tempering, carburization, carbon nitriding, nitro carburization, bright tempering, annealing, vacuum brazing, temperature brazing, plasma nitriding

References

External links
 Ipsen

Companies based in North Rhine-Westphalia
Manufacturing companies of Germany
Industrial furnaces
Manufacturing companies established in 1948
1948 establishments in Illinois